I.R.S. No Speak was an instrumental-only imprint of the I.R.S. Records record label, founded by Miles Copeland III in January 1988. Inspired by the success of Peter Baumann's Private Music, Windham Hill Records and Capitol Records Cinema Records, Copeland wanted to feature some of the many excellent rock musicians who had been left unemployed by the 1980s disco and punk takeover of the music industry. He also wanted to take a poke at new-age music, stating in the introductory brochure, "It should be apparent that what No Speak isn't is New Age. No Speak eats New Age for breakfast." Though musically successful the label was not financially viable, and folded after only three years and 19 releases.

No Speak Catalog

References

American record labels
I.R.S. Records
1988 establishments in the United States